"Live Free or Die" is the 71st episode of the HBO original series The Sopranos and the sixth of the show's sixth season. Written by David Chase, Terence Winter, Robin Green, and Mitchell Burgess, and directed by Tim Van Patten, it originally aired on April 16, 2006.

Starring
 James Gandolfini as Tony Soprano
 Lorraine Bracco as Dr. Jennifer Melfi 
 Edie Falco as Carmela Soprano
 Michael Imperioli as Christopher Moltisanti
 Dominic Chianese as Corrado Soprano, Jr. *
 Steven Van Zandt as Silvio Dante
 Tony Sirico as Paulie Gualtieri
 Robert Iler as Anthony Soprano, Jr. 
 Jamie-Lynn Sigler as Meadow Soprano
 Aida Turturro as Janice Soprano Baccalieri *
 Steven R. Schirripa as Bobby Baccalieri
 Frank Vincent as Phil Leotardo
 John Ventimiglia as Artie Bucco
 Joseph R. Gannascoli as Vito Spatafore
 Dan Grimaldi as Patsy Parisi
 Toni Kalem as Angie Bonpensiero
 Sharon Angela as Rosalie Aprile

* = credit only

Guest starring

Synopsis  

Christopher reports to Tony and his crew that Vito has been spotted in a gay club. Meadow reveals to Carmela that Finn witnessed Vito performing oral sex on a security guard. As a result, Finn is taken by Tony to the back room of Satriale's where, very frightened, he has to repeat the story for the crew. The main reaction is disgust and anger; Carlo says they should "put him down for the honor of the family." Tony, despite everything, is hesitant to kill Vito. As he tells Dr. Melfi, he abhors homosexuality, and is “a strict Catholic”; but he doesn’t mind what happens between consenting adults, and he cares about Vito as a friend and an earner. "I had a second chance,” he says. “Why shouldn't he?"

Benny, Dante Greco and Terry Doria visit Vito and his mistress at a beach house on the Jersey Shore, where he's been lying low. They try to escort him to see Tony, but he speeds away. Vito returns home later that night, kisses his sleeping children, packs some keepsakes, necessities, and cash, and drives off into a stormy night. After his car hits a downed tree branch, he proceeds on foot and finds himself stranded in a small town in New Hampshire. Exhausted, he checks into an inn. Vito has cousins in New Hampshire but cannot find them. He stays in the pleasant town, comfortable in its friendly, open-minded ambiance.

Meadow starts an internship at a law firm handling white collar crimes, although she is also working as a volunteer in a law center. In an argumentative conversation with Finn, she contrasts the soft treatment of white-collar criminals with the harsh treatment of others, for example, the humiliation of Johnny at his daughter's wedding. Finn challenges her values and notes her hypocrisy: Tony's crew is going to punish Vito for his sexual orientation. Meadow storms out.

Carmela discovers that Angie Bonpensiero has secretly branched out into business with members of the crime family, putting money up for street loans and buying stolen car parts. Carmela is still pressuring Tony to get permission from the building inspector to move forward with her spec house, which he seems to keep forgetting. She is appalled to find that Hugh has been selling materials salvaged from the construction site.

Tony informs Chris that two Italian hitmen will be sent over to the U.S. to kill Rusty, and tells him to hire a "third party" to equip them with weapons and act as an intermediary between the assassins and the Soprano family. Chris gives the task to Corky Caporale, a Soprano family associate who speaks Italian, and pays him in heroin.

First appearances
 Corky Caporale: A DiMeo crime family associate and heroin addict who is tasked with serving as the "third party" intermediary between Christopher Moltisanti and the Italian hitmen coming to murder Rusty Millio.
 Jim Witowski: Owner of a local diner at Dartford, New Hampshire, the town where Vito has taken refuge.

Title reference 
 The episode's title, "Live Free or Die," refers to the New Hampshire state motto, which Vito notices on a license plate while he is browsing an antique shop.
 It also possibly refers to Vito's options: Live free (stay in New Hampshire) or die (return to New Jersey).

Production
Night Club scene filmed at Big Al's Redzone in Queens.
 Sharon Angela (Rosalie Aprile) is promoted to the main cast and now billed in the opening credits for the episodes in which she appears, with some exceptions.
 "Live Free or Die" is the final episode written by the married writing team of Robin Green and Mitchell Burgess. They left the series, which they had been with since the first season, to produce a new project for HBO, which never took shape. This is also one of only three episodes in the entire series where four writers share credit for the script, the others being "Calling All Cars" of Season 4 and Season 6 Part II premiere "Soprano Home Movies."
 The scenes filmed for the fictional town of Dartford, New Hampshire were actually filmed in Boonton, New Jersey.
 The highway Vito was traveling on when his car broke down, New Hampshire Route 228, is also fictitious.

Other cultural references
 In the opening scene, Tony is sitting by his pool reading Yachting.
 When Christopher's friend "Murmur," standing outside the AA meeting, asks the guy from Yonkers if he's "lost," it recalls the title of the play and movie Lost in Yonkers.
 When Meadow explains to her family about a Muslim family who was in need of legal assistance, she mentions 9/11 and how George W. Bush is “using it as an excuse to erode our constitutional protections.”
 Tony asks Chris if he thinks Ahmed and Muhammad are Al-Qaeda operatives; Chris doesn’t think so.
 Tony angrily calls Carlo, who talks about killing Vito, Judge Roy Bean.
 When the highway department worker finds Vito's phone on the side of the road and is antagonized by Tony, Tony says "Oh, yeah? Telephone tough guy, eh?" Joe Pesci, known for his mobster roles, says this exact line while arguing with Mel Gibson's character in a scene from the film Lethal Weapon 4.
 After Finn confirms to the Soprano crew that he caught Vito performing a sex act on a security guard ("Unidentified Black Males"), Christopher suggests that he should cut off his penis and "feed it to him." This same fate befell actor Michael Imperioli's character at the hands of the Viet Cong in the film Dead Presidents.
 Also in the scene where Finn confirms Vito's sexual preference, the table and the seating of the crew around the table suggest The Last Supper in placement, as well as mood, as "betrayal" is an oft-repeated suggestion by Christopher, Paulie among others.
 Silvio tells Tony that Paulie has "gone Mau-Mau" on the subject of the necessity of killing Vito.  This is a reference to the brutal Mau-Mau uprising in Kenya (1952–1960).
 In the scene with Dr. Melfi, Tony referenced the controversial comments made by Senator Rick Santorum (pronouncing his last name as "Sanatorium") who once claimed that allowing gay marriage would be the first step in a slippery slope leading to tolerance of more taboo practices, including bestiality.
 Also in the scene with Dr. Melfi, Tony referenced a Showtime series (The L Word) when talking about "that lesbian show with Jennifer Beals."
 When discussing Ahmed and Mohammad with Tony, Christopher mentions their reaction to the "Danish cartoons" incident - the 2005 Jyllands-Posten Muhammad cartoons controversy.
 After speaking with Carlo in the backroom of the Bada Bing, Tony starts reading the Robb Report magazine.
 At a diner in Dartford, Vito is introduced to jonnycakes, pancakes made with white corn meal. "Johnny Cakes" is also the title of the eighth episode of the season.
 Vito also tries to order some Jimmy Dean sausages.
 The room that the innkeeper assigns to Vito Spatafore is called the "Franklin Pierce" room, a reference to the 14th President of the United States, a native of New Hampshire.
 When Carmela is confronting her father Hugh De Angelis for looting their stop-ordered spec house, Hugh mockingly calls her Sarah Bernhardt, a 19th and 20th-century French actress.

Music
 The song playing in the background of the scene at the Bada Bing! during the meeting discussing Vito's sighting at a gay bar is Rock & Roll Queen by The Subways
 The song playing on the radio in the New Hampshire diner where Vito eats his breakfast is Let the Teardrops Fall, performed by Patsy Cline.
 After Meadow tells Carmela and Rosalie Aprile about Vito and the security guard, Tony comes down the stairs singing the opening line of "Aqualung" by Jethro Tull.
 The songs playing in the background of the scene at the Bada Bing! when Tony promotes Carlo are "Loops of Fury" by The Chemical Brothers and "After" by Wide Open Cage.
 The song played during the end credits is "4th of July" by X.

References

External links
"Live Free or Die"  at HBO

2006 American television episodes
The Sopranos (season 6) episodes
Television episodes written by David Chase
Television episodes written by Terence Winter